New York City, the most populous city in the United States, is home to over 7,000 completed high-rise buildings of at least , of which at least 101 are taller than . The tallest building in New York is One World Trade Center, which rises . The 104-story skyscraper also stands as the tallest building in the United States, the tallest building in the Western Hemisphere, and the seventh-tallest building in the world. At , Central Park Tower is the second-tallest completed building in the city. It has the highest roof of any building outside Asia, and is the tallest residential building in the world. The third-tallest completed building in the city is 111 West 57th Street. The fourth-tallest is One Vanderbilt. At , it is the tallest office building in Midtown.

At , the 102-story Empire State Building in Midtown Manhattan, which was finished in 1931, stood as the tallest building in the world from its completion until 1970, when construction on the  North Tower of the original World Trade Center surpassed it. It is the ninth-tallest building in the United States, and rises to a pinnacle of  including its antenna. The North Tower (the original One World Trade Center), along with its twin the South Tower (the first Two World Trade Center), which was six feet shorter, held this title only briefly as they were both surpassed by construction of the 110-story Willis Tower (then, and still colloquially, known as the Sears Tower) in Chicago in 1973. The Twin Towers remained the tallest buildings in New York City until they were destroyed in 2001 during the September 11 attacks, leaving the Empire State Building again as the city's tallest building. If the Twin Towers were still standing today, they would be sixth and seventh on the list, with their replacement—the new One World Trade Center—being excluded.

The new One World Trade Center began construction in 2006; in April 2012 it surpassed the Empire State Building to become the city's tallest. Upon its topping out in May 2013, the  One World Trade Center surpassed the Willis Tower to become the tallest building in the United States, and the Western Hemisphere. One World Trade Center is part of the redevelopment of the World Trade Center, which also includes the  3 World Trade Center, the  4 World Trade Center, the  7 World Trade Center, the proposed 900-foot (274 m) 5 World Trade Center, and one partly constructed on-hold building: the  2 World Trade Center.

The majority of skyscrapers in New York City are concentrated in Midtown and Downtown Manhattan, although other neighborhoods of Manhattan and the boroughs of Brooklyn, Queens, and the Bronx also contain some high-rises.
, there were 309 completed skyscrapers that rose at least  in height, more than any other city in the United States, and third most in the world exceeded only by Hong Kong and Shenzhen; an additional 20 are under construction.

History
The history of skyscrapers in New York City began with the construction of the Equitable Life, Western Union, and Tribune buildings in the early 1870s. These relatively short early skyscrapers, sometimes referred to as "preskyscrapers" or "protoskyscrapers", included features such as a steel frame and elevators—then-new innovations that were used in the city's later skyscrapers. Though not the city's first high-rise, it was the first building to surpass the  spire of Trinity Church. The World Building, which stood as the tallest in the city until 1899, was demolished in 1955 to allow for the construction of an expanded entrance to the Brooklyn Bridge. By 1900, fifteen skyscrapers in New York City exceeded  in height.

New York has played a prominent role in the development of the skyscraper. Since 1890, ten of those built in the city have held the title of world's tallest. New York City went through two very early high-rise construction booms, the first of which spanned the 1890s through the 1910s, and the second from the mid-1920s to the early 1930s. During this period 44 skyscrapers over  were built—including the Singer Building, Met Life Tower, Woolworth Building, 40 Wall Street, the Chrysler Building, and the Empire State Building, each of which was the tallest in the world at the time of its completion, the last remaining so for forty years.

Skyscraper construction resumed in the early 1960s, with construction surges in the early 1970s, late 1980s, and late 2010s.

Tallest buildings
This includes spires and architectural details but does not include antenna masts. An equal sign (=) following a rank indicates the same height between two or more buildings. An asterisk (*) indicates that the building is still under construction but has been topped out. The "Year" column indicates the year in which a building was completed.

Tallest buildings by pinnacle height

This list ranks buildings in New York City based on pinnacle height measurement, which includes antenna masts. Standard architectural height measurement, which excludes non-architectural antennas in building height, is included for comparative purposes. An equal sign (=) following a rank indicates the same height between two or more buildings. The "Year" column indicates the year in which a building was completed.

Tallest buildings in each borough

This lists the tallest building in each borough of New York City based on standard height measurement. The "Year" column indicates the year in which a building was completed.

Tallest under construction or proposed

Under construction 
This lists buildings that are currently under construction in New York City and are expected to rise to a height of at least . Buildings under construction that have already been topped out are also included, as are those whose construction has been suspended. For buildings whose heights have not yet been released by their developers, this table uses a floor count of 50 stories as the cutoff.

* Table entries with dashes (—) indicate that information regarding expected building heights or dates of completion has not yet been released.

Approved and proposed 
This table lists buildings that are proposed for construction in New York City and are expected to rise at least  in height. For buildings whose heights have not yet been released by their developers, this table uses a floor count of 50 stories as the cutoff.

* Table entries with dashes (—) indicate that information regarding building heights or dates of completion has not yet been released.

Tallest destroyed or demolished
This table lists buildings in New York City that were destroyed or demolished and at one time stood at least  in height.

Timeline of tallest buildings
This lists buildings that once held the title of tallest building in New York City. Both Trinity Church and the Empire State Building have held the title twice, the latter following the destruction of the World Trade Center in the September 11 attacks. The Empire State Building was surpassed by One World Trade Center in 2012.

See also

 Architecture of New York City
 List of cities with the most skyscrapers
 List of tallest buildings
 List of tallest buildings in the United States
 List of tallest buildings in Albany
 List of tallest buildings in Brooklyn
 List of tallest buildings in Buffalo
 List of tallest buildings in Jersey City
 List of tallest buildings in New Jersey
 List of tallest buildings in Queens
 List of tallest buildings in Rochester
 List of tallest buildings in Upstate New York

Notes

References

Citations

Sources

External links

 Diagram of New York City skyscrapers on SkyscraperPage
 100 years of New York skyline on Favrify

 
Tallest
New York City
New York City
Tallest buildings